Bicilia persinualis is a moth in the family Crambidae. It was described by George Hampson in 1899. It is found in Brazil.

References

Moths described in 1899
Spilomelinae